Touriya Haoud is a Dutch actress, model, and singer. Formally based in the United States, she moved back to the Netherlands in 2021.

Personal life 
On June 4, 2006, she married American actor Greg Vaughan. The couple has three sons: Jathan James (born May 4, 2007), Cavan Thomas (born January 19, 2010), and Landan Reid (born March 5, 2012). During their marriage, the couple lived in Los Angeles, California and Charlotte, North Carolina. On 14 April 2014, Haoud and Vaughan announced their separation. In 2021 she moved back to the Netherlands following their divorce. Their children live with Vaughan in the United States.

Selected filmography
<div style="font-size: 95%">

</div style="font-size: 95%">

References

External links 
 

1977 births
Living people
Dutch female models
Dutch film actresses
Dutch people of Macedonian descent
Dutch people of Moroccan descent
Dutch television actresses
People from Rhenen
21st-century Dutch actresses